Docker, Inc. is an American technology company that develops productivity tools built around Docker, which automates the deployment of code inside software containers. Major products of the company are Docker Hub, a central repository of containers, and Docker Desktop, a GUI application for Windows and Mac to manage containers.

History

The company was founded as dotCloud in 2008 by Kamel Founadi, Solomon Hykes, and Sebastien Pahl in Paris, and incorporated in the United States in 2010. In July, 2013, Benjamin Golub (formerly of Plaxo and Gluster) became chief executive.

On September 19, 2013, dotCloud and Red Hat announced an alliance to integrate Docker with OpenShift Red Hat’s Platform-as-a-Service (PaaS) offering.
On October 29, 2013, dotCloud was renamed Docker.

On July 23, 2014, Docker acquired two-person startup Orchard.

On August 4, 2014 the dotCloud technology and brand was sold to cloudControl.
Four person company Koality was acquired on October 7, 2014.

On October 15, 2014 Microsoft announced a partnership, and its services were announced for the Amazon Elastic Compute Cloud (EC2) on November 13, 2014.

Docker was estimated to be valued at over $1 billion, making it what is called a "unicorn company", after a $95 million fundraising round in April 2015.

In April 2016, it was revealed that the C.I.A.'s investment arm In-Q-Tel was a large investor in Docker.

In May 2019, Rob Bearden became CEO.

In November 2019, Mirantis, a cloud computing company, acquired Docker's enterprise business.
and Scott Johnston became CEO.

On August 31, 2021 Docker released Docker Business subscription for large companies, and changed the licensing terms for Docker Desktop users.

Venture rounds 

 February 28, 2011 - $800K seed capital from Chris Sacca, Jerry Yang, Ron Conway and others.
 March 22, 2011 - $10 million Series A - Led by Benchmark Capital and Trinity Ventures.
 January 21, 2014 - $15 million Series B - Led by Greylock Partners.
 September 16, 2014 - $40 million Series C - Led by Sequoia Capital.
 April 14, 2015 - $95 million Series D - Led by Insight Venture Partners.
 November 2015 - $18 million Series D.
 November 13, 2019 - $35 million Series A.
 March 16, 2021 - $23 million Series B- Led by Tribe Capital.
 March 31, 2022 - $105 million Series C - Led by Bain Capital.

Acquisitions
 July 23, 2014 - Orchard
 February 26, 2015 - SocketPlane
 January 21, 2016 - Unikernel Systems
 April 11, 2022 - Infosiftr
 May 10, 2022 - Nestybox
 May 24, 2022 - Tilt
 June 21, 2022 - Atomist

References

Free software companies
Software companies based in the San Francisco Bay Area
Software companies established in 2013
Software companies of the United States
2013 establishments in the United States
2013 establishments in California
Companies established in 2013